Hordeum mosaic virus (HoMV) is a pathogenic plant virus. It affects barley crops.

See also
 List of barley diseases

External links
 ICTVdB - The Universal Virus Database: Hordeum mosaic virus
 Family Groups - The Baltimore Method

Potyviridae
Viral plant pathogens and diseases